The Abdie stone is a Class I Pictish stone that stands in Abdie Churchyard, Lindores, Fife, Scotland.

Location
The stone originally stood on the crest of Kaim Hill. It was removed and incorporated in a garden wall in Grange of Lindores before being moved to the Morthouse of Abdie Church.

Description
It bears incised Pictish symbols on two faces, a Triple disc and crescent and v rod on one and a Mirror on another.

References

Pictish stones